Richie Asiata (born 3 May 1996) is a New Zealand born Australian rugby union player, currently playing for Major League Rugby side Toronto Arrows. His preferred position is prop of hooker.

Professional career
Asiata signed for Major League Rugby side Toronto Arrows ahead of the 2020 Major League Rugby season, and re-signed ahead of the 2021 Major League Rugby season. He previously represented  in the National Rugby Championship between 2016 and 2018.

References

External links
itsrugby.co.uk Profile

1996 births
Living people
Australian rugby union players
Australian sportspeople of Samoan descent
Rugby union props
Rugby union hookers
Rugby union players from Auckland
Queensland Country (NRC team) players
Toronto Arrows players
Queensland Reds players